"Las Cruces Jail" is the first single from the album, What the Toll Tells by Two Gallants. It was a limited, 7" single. The album was the 90th release of Saddle Creek Records.

The song's lyrics are about Billy the Kid's imprisonment near Las Cruces, New Mexico.

Track listing
Side One: "Las Cruces Jail"
Side Two: "Long Summer Day (acoustic)"

External links
Two Gallants official website
Saddle Creek Records

Two Gallants (band) songs
2005 songs
Saddle Creek Records singles
Songs based on actual events
Songs about crime
Songs about criminals
Songs about Billy the Kid